Heal is a surname. Notable people with the surname include:
 Aaron Heal (born 1983), Australian cricketer
 Albert Victor Heal (1887–1975), architect and designer
 Ambrose Heal (1872–1959), English furniture designer and businessman
 Felicity Heal (born 1945), British historian and academic
 Graham Heal (1945–2018), Australian rules footballer
 Jack Heal (1919–1988), Australian rules footballer
 Jane Heal (born 1946), British philosopher
 Jim Heal, American football coach
 John Daniel Heal (1825–1908), alderman and mayor of Brisbane, Australia
 Marc Heal (born 1965), English musician
 Michael Heal (born 1948), English cricketer
 Rachel Heal (born 1973), English racing cyclist
 Shane Heal (born 1970), Australian basketball player
 Shyla Heal (born 2001), Australian basketball player
 Stan Heal (1920–2010), Australian rules footballer
 Sylvia Heal (born 1942), British Member of Parliament

See also 
 Healy (surname)